Charles Proteus Steinmetz (born Karl August Rudolph Steinmetz, April 9, 1865 – October 26, 1923) was a German-born American mathematician and electrical engineer and professor at Union College. He fostered the development of alternating current that made possible the expansion of the electric power industry in the United States, formulating mathematical theories for engineers. He made ground-breaking discoveries in the understanding of hysteresis that enabled engineers to design better electromagnetic apparatus equipment, especially electric motors for use in industry.

At the time of his death, Steinmetz held over 200 patents. A genius in both mathematics and electronics, he did work that earned him the nicknames "Forger of Thunderbolts" and "The Wizard of Schenectady". Steinmetz's equation, Steinmetz solids, Steinmetz curves, and Steinmetz equivalent circuit are all named after him, as are numerous honors and scholarships, including the IEEE Charles Proteus Steinmetz Award, one of the highest technical recognitions given by the Institute of Electrical and Electronics Engineers professional society.

Early life and education

Steinmetz was born Karl August Rudolph Steinmetz on April 9, 1865, in Breslau, Province of Silesia, Prussia (now Wrocław, Poland) the son of Caroline (Neubert) and Karl Heinrich Steinmetz. He was baptized as a Lutheran into the Evangelical Church of Prussia. Steinmetz attended Johannes Gymnasium and astonished his teachers with his proficiency in mathematics and physics.

Following the Gymnasium, Steinmetz went on to the University of Breslau to begin work on his undergraduate degree in 1883. He was on the verge of finishing his doctorate in 1888 when he came under investigation by the German police for activities on behalf of a socialist university group and articles he had written for a local socialist newspaper.

Socialism and technocracy
As socialist meetings and press had been banned in Germany, Steinmetz fled to Zürich in 1889 to escape possible arrest. Cornell University Professor Ronald R. Kline, author of Steinmetz: Engineer and Socialist, contended that other factors were more directly involved in Steinmetz's decision to leave his homeland such as being in arrears with his tuition at the university and life at home with his father, stepmother and their daughters being tension-filled.

Faced with an expiring visa, he emigrated to the United States in 1889. He changed his first name to "Charles" in order to sound more American, and chose the middle name "Proteus", a wise hunchbacked character from the Odyssey who knew many secrets, after a childhood epithet given by classmates Steinmetz felt suited him.
 
Despite his earlier efforts and interest in socialism, by 1922 Steinmetz concluded that socialism would never work in the United States, because the country lacked a "powerful, centralized government of competent men, remaining continuously in office", and because "only a small percentage of Americans accept this viewpoint today".

A member of the original Technical Alliance, which also included Thorstein Veblen and Leland Olds, Steinmetz had great faith in the ability of machines to eliminate human toil and create abundance for all. He put it this way: "Some day we [will] make the good things of life for everybody."

Electrical engineering

Steinmetz is known for his contribution in three major fields of alternating current (AC) systems theory: hysteresis, steady-state analysis, and transients.

AC hysteresis theory
Shortly after arriving in the United States, Steinmetz went to work for Rudolf Eickemeyer in Yonkers, New York, and published in the field of magnetic hysteresis, earning worldwide professional recognition.  Eickemeyer's firm developed transformers for use in the transmission of electrical power among many other mechanical and electrical devices. In 1893 Eickemeyer's company, along with all of its patents and designs, was bought by the newly formed General Electric Company, where Steinmetz quickly became known as the engineering wizard in GE's engineering community.

AC steady state circuit theory
Steinmetz's work revolutionized AC circuit theory and analysis, which had been carried out using complicated, time-consuming calculus-based methods. In the groundbreaking paper, "Complex Quantities and Their Use in Electrical Engineering", presented at a July 1893 meeting published in the American Institute of Electrical Engineers (AIEE), Steinmetz simplified these complicated methods to "a simple problem of algebra". He systematized the use of complex number phasor representation in electrical engineering education texts, whereby the lower-case letter "j" is used to designate the 90-degree rotation operator in AC system analysis. His seminal books and many other AIEE papers "taught a whole generation of engineers how to deal with AC phenomena".

AC transient theory
Steinmetz also greatly advanced the understanding of lightning.  His systematic experiments resulted in the first laboratory created "man-made lightning", earning him the nickname the "Forger of Thunderbolts".  These were conducted in a football field-sized laboratory at General Electric, using 120,000 volt generators. He also erected a lightning tower to attract natural lightning to study its patterns and effects, which resulted in several theories.

Professional life
Steinmetz acted in the following professional capacities:
 At Union College, as chair of electrical engineering from 1902 to 1913 and as faculty member thereafter until his death in 1923
 Board member on the Schenectady Board of Education for six years, including four years as the board's president
 President of the Common Council of Schenectady 
 President of the American Institute of Electrical Engineers from 1901 to 1902 
 First vice-president of the International Association of Municipal Electricians (IAME) {which later became the International Municipal Signal Association (IMSA)} from 1913 until his death in 1923.

He was granted an honorary degree from Harvard University in 1901 and a doctorate from Union College in 1903.

Steinmetz wrote 13 books and 60 articles, not exclusively about engineering. He was a member and adviser to the fraternity Phi Gamma Delta at Union College, whose chapter house was one of the first electrified residences.

While serving as president of the Schenectady Board of Education, Steinmetz introduced numerous progressive reforms, including extended school hours, school meals, school nurses, special classes for the children of immigrants, and the distribution of free textbooks.

Personal life

Steinmetz was affected by kyphosis, as was his father and grandfather. In spite of his love for children and family life, Steinmetz remained unmarried, to prevent his spinal deformity from being passed to any offspring.

When Joseph LeRoy Hayden, a loyal and hardworking lab assistant, announced that he would marry and look for his own living quarters, Steinmetz made the unusual proposal of opening his large home, complete with research lab, greenhouse, and office to the Haydens and their prospective family. Hayden favored the idea, but his future wife was wary of the unorthodox arrangement. She agreed after Steinmetz's assurance that she could run the house as she saw fit.

After an uneasy start, the arrangement worked well for all parties, especially after three Hayden children were born. Steinmetz legally adopted Joseph Hayden as his son, becoming grandfather to the youngsters, entertaining them with fantastic stories and spectacular scientific demonstrations. The unusual, harmonious living arrangement lasted for the rest of Steinmetz's life.

Steinmetz founded America's first glider club, but none of its prototypes "could be dignified with the term 'flight.

Steinmetz was a lifelong agnostic.  He died on October 26, 1923, and was buried in Vale Cemetery in Schenectady.

Legacy

Steinmetz earned wide recognition among the scientific community and numerous awards and honors both during his life and posthumously.

Steinmetz's equation, derived from his experiments, defines the approximate heat energy due to magnetic hysteresis released, per cycle per unit volume of magnetic material. A Steinmetz solid is the solid body generated by the intersection of two or three cylinders of equal radius at right angles. Steinmetz' equivalent circuit is still widely used for the design and testing of induction machines.

One of the highest technical recognitions given by the Institute of Electrical and Electronics Engineers, the "IEEE Charles Proteus Steinmetz Award", is given for major contributions to standardization within the field of electrical and electronics engineering. Other awards include the Certificate of Merit of Franklin Institute, 1908; the Elliott Cresson Medal, 1913; and the Cedergren Medal, 1914.

The Charles P. Steinmetz Memorial Lecture series was begun in his honor in 1925, sponsored by the Schenectady branch of the IEEE. Through 2017 seventy-three gatherings have taken place, held almost exclusively at Union College, featuring notable figures such as Nobel laureate experimental physicist Robert A. Millikan, helicopter inventor Igor Sikorsky, nuclear submarine pioneer Admiral Hyman G. Rickover (1963), Nobel-winning semiconductor inventor William Shockley, and Internet "founding father" Leonard Kleinrock.

Steinmetz's connection to Union is further celebrated with the annual Steinmetz Symposium, a day-long event in which Union undergraduates give presentations on research they have done. Steinmetz Hall, which houses the Union College computer center, is named after him.

The Charles P. Steinmetz Scholarship is awarded annually by the college, underwritten since its inception in 1923 by the General Electric Company. An additional Charles P. Steinmetz Memorial Scholarship was later established at Union by Marjorie Hayden, daughter of Joseph and Corrine Hayden, and is awarded to students majoring in engineering or physics.

A 1914 "Duplex Drive Brougham" Detroit Electric automobile that once belonged to Steinmetz was purchased by Union College in 1971, and restored for use in campus ceremonies. The Steinmetz car is permanent displayed in the first-floor corridor between the Wold Center and F.W. Olin building.

A Chicago public high school, Steinmetz College Prep, is named for him, as well as a Schenectady public school, the Steinmetz Career and Leadership Academy.

A public park in north Schenectady, New York was named for him in 1931.

In 1983, the US Post Office included Steinmetz in a series of postage stamps commemorating American inventors.

In May 2015, a life-size bronze statue of Charles Steinmetz meeting Thomas Edison by sculptor and caster Dexter Benedict was unveiled on a plaza on the corner of Erie Boulevards and South Ferry Street in Schenectady.

In popular culture
Steinmetz is featured in John Dos Passos' U.S.A. trilogy in one of the biographies.  He also serves as a major character in Starling Lawrence's The Lightning Keeper.

Steinmetz is a major character in the novel Electric City by Elizabeth Rosner.

Moe sarcastically refers to Curly as a "Steinmetz" in the 1944 Three Stooges short Busy Buddies.

Steinmetz was portrayed in 1959 by the actor Rod Steiger in the CBS television anthology series, The Joseph Cotten Show. The episode focused on his socialist activities in Germany.

A famous anecdote about Steinmetz concerns a troubleshooting consultation at Henry Ford's River Rouge Plant. A humorous aspect of the story is the "itemized bill" he submitted for the work performed.

Bibliography

Patents
At the time of his death, Steinmetz held over 200 patents:

 , "System of distribution by alternating current" (January 29, 1895)
 , "Inductor dynamo"
 , "Three phase induction meter"
 , "Inductor dynamo"
 , "Induction motor"
 , "System of electrical distribution"
 , "Induction motor"
 , "Means for producing light" (May 7, 1912)
 , "Induction furnace"
 , "Protective device"
 , "Inductor dynamo"

Works

 
 
 
  This book's first edition was expanded and updated in many subsequent editions.

See also

 Charles P. Steinmetz Academic Centre
 IEEE Charles Proteus Steinmetz Award
 :de:Steinmetzschaltung (Steinmetz circuit)

Explanatory notes

Citations

General sources

External links

 "Charles Steinmetz: Union's Electrical Wizard", Union College Magazine, November 1, 1998.
 Finding Aid to Charles Steinmetz Papers, Schenectady County Historical Society.
 Charles Proteus Steinmetz, the Wizard of Schenectady , Smithsonian Institution
 Charles Proteus Steinmetz: Accomplishments and Life, Edison Tech Center, Hall of Fame
 United States Supreme Court, Steinmetz v. Allen, 192 U.S. 543 (1904). Steinmetz v. Allen, Commissioner of Patents. No. 383. Argued January 12, 13, 1904. Decided February 23, 1904.
 Divine Discontent, a documentary on Steinmetz
 

1865 births
1923 deaths
American agnostics
American democratic socialists
American electrical engineers
American inventors
American people with disabilities
Engineers from New York (state)
Engineers from Wrocław
European democratic socialists
General Electric people
German emigrants to the United States
Members of the Socialist Party of America
People from the Province of Silesia
People with dwarfism
Scientists with disabilities
Schenectady City Council members
Scientists from Schenectady, New York
University of Breslau alumni